Actinopus liodon is a species of mygalomorph spiders in the family Actinopodidae. It is found in Uruguay.

References

liodon
Spiders described in 1875